Chibabo may refer to:

Chibabo, Angola
Chibabo, Eritrea